The Mahogany Mountains are a mountain range located on the Nevada-Utah border, located in Lincoln County, Nevada and Iron County, Utah.

The range highpoint is Mahogany Peak (Lincoln County) located center-northwest, and about 8665 ft in height. The Needle Mountains (Nevada-Utah) are attached north, and both ranges lie attached to the south terminus of the White Rock Mountains of Nevada.

References

External links
Mahogany Peak (Lincoln County), (lat-long.com) (coordinates and elevation)

Mountain ranges of Nevada
Mountain ranges of Utah
Mountain ranges of Lincoln County, Nevada
Mountain ranges of Iron County, Utah